Yannis Ioannidis (Istanbul, 1959) is a Greek computer scientist who is the current President of the Association for Computing Machinery. He is a professor at the University of Athens as well as an Associated Faculty at the "Athena" Research and Innovation Center, where he also served as the President and General Director for 10 years (2011–2021).

References

External links 
 Google Scholar profile

1959 births
Living people
Human–computer interaction researchers
National Technical University of Athens alumni
Academic staff of the National and Kapodistrian University of Athens
Database researchers
Greek computer scientists
Fellows of the Association for Computing Machinery
Fellow Members of the IEEE
Presidents of the Association for Computing Machinery
Constantinopolitan Greeks
Academics from Istanbul
People from Athens